Eth (uppercase: Ð, lowercase: ð; also spelled edh or eð), known as ðæt in Old English, is a letter used in Old English, Middle English, Icelandic, Faroese (in which it is called edd), Khmer and Elfdalian. 

It was also used in Scandinavia during the Middle Ages, but was subsequently replaced with dh, and later d. 

It is often transliterated as d. 

The lowercase version has been adopted to represent a voiced dental fricative in the International Phonetic Alphabet.

Old English
In Old English, ð (called ) was used interchangeably with þ to represent the Old English dental fricative phoneme  or its allophone , which exist in modern English phonology as the voiced and voiceless dental fricatives both now spelled "th".

Unlike the runic letter þ, ð is a modified Roman letter. Neither ð nor þ were found in the earliest records of Old English. A study of Mercian royal diplomas found that ð (along with đ) began to emerge in the early 8th century, with ð becoming strongly preferred by the 780s. Another source indicates that the letter is "derived from Irish writing".  

Under King Alfred the Great, þ grew greatly in popularity and started to overtake ð. Þ completely overtook ð by Middle English, and þ died out by Early Modern English, mostly due to the rise of the printing press, and was replaced by the digraph th.

Lower case version
The lowercase (minuscule) version has retained the curved shape of a medieval scribe's d, which d itself in general has not.

Icelandic
In Icelandic, ð, called "eð", represents a voiced dental fricative , which is the same as the th in English that, but it never appears as the first letter of a word. The ð in the name of the letter is devoiced in the Nominative and Accusative cases . In the Icelandic alphabet, ð follows d.

Faroese
In Faroese, ð is not assigned to any particular phoneme and appears mostly for etymological reasons, but it indicates most  glides. When ð appears before r, it is in a few words pronounced . In the Faroese alphabet, ð follows d.

Welsh
Ð has also been used by some in written Welsh to represent , which is normally represented as dd.

Khmer
Ðð sometimes used in Khmer romanization to represents  .

Phonetic transcription
 represents a voiced dental fricative in the International Phonetic Alphabet.

 is used in phonetic transcription.

 is used in the Uralic Phonetic Alphabet.

Computer input
The Faroese and Icelandic keyboard layouts have a dedicated button for eth.

On Microsoft Windows, eth can be typed using the alt code +() for lowercase or +() for uppercase, or by typing  using the US International keyboard layout. On Windows 10, it can also be inserted into text via the symbol menu, presented by using +, then selecting Symbols, associated with the Omega (Ω) character, and then selecting Latin Symbols, associated with the C-cedilla (Ç) character.

On ChromeOS with 'extended keyboard' Chrome extension,  will result in ð being displayed;   will result in Ð.

Other

Modern uses
The letter ð is sometimes used in mathematics and engineering textbooks, as a symbol for a spin-weighted partial derivative. 

This operator gives rise to spin-weighted spherical harmonics.

A capital eth is used as the currency symbol for Dogecoin.

See also
 African D
 D
 D with stroke
 Insular script
 T
 Thorn

References

Further reading

External links

 
 .

Faroese language
Gaulish language
Icelandic language
Middle English
Old English
D
D stroke
D stroke
D
English th